Édson Luciano Ribeiro (born December 8, 1972) is a Brazilian sprinter competing mostly in 100 metres. He has been successful on regional level, and won two Olympic medals with the Brazilian 4 x 100 metres relay team.

His personal best time achieved in 1998, is 10.14 seconds.

Achievements 
(100 metres unless noted)

2003 South American Championships - gold medal
2003 World Championships in Athletics - silver medal (4x100 metres relay)
2000 Olympic Games - silver medal (4x100 metres relay)
1999 South American Championships - gold medal (200 metres)
1999 World Championships in Athletics - bronze medal (4x100 metres relay)
1996 Olympic Games - bronze medal (4x100 metres relay)
1995 South American Championships - silver medal

External links

1972 births
Living people
Brazilian male sprinters
Athletes (track and field) at the 1996 Summer Olympics
Athletes (track and field) at the 2000 Summer Olympics
Athletes (track and field) at the 2004 Summer Olympics
Athletes (track and field) at the 1999 Pan American Games
Athletes (track and field) at the 2003 Pan American Games
Pan American Games athletes for Brazil
Olympic athletes of Brazil
Olympic bronze medalists for Brazil
Olympic silver medalists for Brazil
World Athletics Championships medalists
People from Bandeirantes
Medalists at the 2000 Summer Olympics
Medalists at the 1996 Summer Olympics
Olympic silver medalists in athletics (track and field)
Olympic bronze medalists in athletics (track and field)
Pan American Games medalists in athletics (track and field)
Pan American Games gold medalists for Brazil
Medalists at the 1999 Pan American Games
Sportspeople from Paraná (state)
21st-century Brazilian people
20th-century Brazilian people